Greencastle Senior High School is a public high school located in Greencastle, Indiana.

See also
 List of high schools in Indiana

References

External links
 

Buildings and structures in Putnam County, Indiana
Schools in Putnam County, Indiana
Public high schools in Indiana